On April 15, 2008, Delta Air Lines and Northwest Airlines announced a merger agreement. The merger of the two carriers formed what was then the largest commercial airline in the world, with 786 aircraft. Delta Air Lines' brand survived, while Northwest's brand officially ended in 2009.

Leading up to the announcement
It had been reported as early as January 2008 that Delta and Northwest were in merger discussions. News reports covering the event and the official press release reported that the new airline would use the Delta name and have its headquarters in Atlanta. The proposed merger partners lost a combined $10.5 billion in first quarter 2008, an amount that exceeded their combined market capitalization.

When the airlines combined, the "new Delta" would be based in Atlanta with a network focused on its main hubs in Atlanta and Detroit, along with other hubs at Minneapolis-St. Paul International Airport, Cincinnati/Northern Kentucky International Airport, John F. Kennedy International Airport in New York City, Salt Lake City International Airport, Los Angeles International Airport, Memphis International Airport (hub later closed in September 2013), Narita International Airport near Tokyo, Amsterdam Airport Schiphol, and Paris-Charles de Gaulle Airport.

Richard Anderson was CEO of Northwest Airlines until 2004, the year before Northwest Airlines declared bankruptcy.  Then, in 2007, he became CEO of Delta Air Lines when the merger took place.

Announcement
On April 14, 2008, both Delta and Northwest Airlines announced that they would merge to create the world's largest airline under the Delta name.  The Atlanta-based combined airline will have $17.7 billion enterprise value. The company also stated on April 14, 2008 that it agreed with its pilot union to extend the existing collective bargaining agreement through the end of 2012. The agreement, subject to a vote by the pilots, provided Delta pilots a 3.5% equity stake in the created new airline.

After the announcement
On September 26, 2008 it was announced that both Delta and Northwest's shareholders had approved the merger. Approval by a federal antitrust review board was the last step needed to finalize the deal. The proposed merger "is likely to produce substantial and credible efficiencies that will benefit U.S. consumers and is not likely to substantially lessen competition," the Justice Department said in a statement issued by its Antitrust Division.

The deal passed through anti-trust overview from the Department of Justice; as most analysts expected, the deal was not blocked, due to the minimal overlap between the two airlines' routes and very little threat to competition in the industry. The merger was also expected to be the subject of several hearings in the United States Congress. Representative Jim Oberstar of Minnesota, who also serves as chair of the House Committee on Transportation and Infrastructure, made clear his opposition to the merger, and he fought it in Washington. There was also strong support for the merger at the Capitol from legislators from Georgia, including Representative Lynn Westmoreland, Representative David Scott, and Senator Johnny Isakson. On August 7, 2008, the merger got regulatory approval from the European Union.

After a six-month investigation, government economists concluded the merger would likely drive down costs for consumers without curbing competition. On October 29, 2008, the United States Department of Justice approved Delta's plan to acquire Northwest.

Delta and Northwest's operating certificates were merged on December 31, 2009. From a technical standpoint, Northwest then ceased to exist as an independent carrier. Ground operations and reservations systems were combined on January 31, 2010.

Transition from Northwest to Delta

In airports where Northwest and Delta operate in separate terminals, one airline moved to the other's terminal. In Tampa International Airport, NWA moved into Delta's Airside E from its previous location in Airside A on April 28, 2009. In Los Angeles International Airport, NWA, which had a smaller operation, moved into Delta's Terminals 5 and 6 from its previous location in Terminal 2 on June 30, 2009.

Northwest WorldPerks was merged into Delta SkyMiles on October 1, 2009.

See also
 Delta Air Lines
 Northwest Airlines
 American Airlines-US Airways merger
 AirTran Airways-Southwest Airlines merger

References

Delta Air Lines
Northwest Airlines
2008 in economics
2008 in aviation
2008 in the United States
2009 mergers and acquisitions